The CBU Capers are the athletic teams that represent Cape Breton University in Sydney, Nova Scotia.  The teams were known as the UCCB Capers from 1982 to 2005 and their present name reflects the change in the institution's name.  There are CBU Capers varsity teams for men's and women's basketball, men's and women's soccer.

Championships
AUS Men's Basketball Championships: 1994, 1995, 2010, 2013
AUS Women's Basketball Championships: 2004, 2006, 2009, 2010, 2011, 2017
AUS Men's Soccer Championships: 2007, 2009, 2016
AUS Women's Soccer Championships: 2003, 2005, 2006, 2007, 2008, 2010, 2015
U Sports women's soccer championships: 2007

Notable athletes
Peter Schaale, Professional footballer.
Isaiah Johnston, Professional footballer with Huntsville City.

References

External links
 Cape Breton University Athletics
 CBU Capers Soccer Magazine

U Sports teams
Sports teams in Nova Scotia
Cape Breton University